Josep Calva was born in 1854 in Les Escaldes, Andorra. He was the general syndic (president) of the general councillor of the Valles of Andorra between 1898 and 1901.

He was the last administrator of the Guilde of Tisserants of Andorra created in 1604. Two books of the Guilde, containing notes going of the 17th century at the beginning of the 20th century, are now to the historic archives of Escaldes-Engordany.

References

General Syndics of the General Council (Andorra)
Members of the General Council (Andorra)